The 1989 Scottish Cup Final was played between Celtic and Rangers at Hampden Park on 20 May 1989.

Celtic won the match 1–0, denying Rangers a domestic treble. The only goal came when Joe Miller capitalised on a defensive error and slotted the ball past Rangers' goalkeeper.

This was the last Old Firm Scottish Cup Final for 10 years until 1999.

While less than 50% of the all-time record crowds at Hampden, the attendance of just over 72,000 has become a landmark figure as no match in Scotland has come close to matching it since, owing to subsequent stadium modernisation which left no venue with a greater capacity.

Match details

References

1989
Cup Final
Scottish Cup Final 1989
Scottish Cup Final 1989
20th century in Glasgow
Old Firm matches